The Mandalay University of Foreign Languages, located in Mandalay, is one of two specialized universities for the study of foreign languages in Myanmar. The university offers Master of Arts program, full-time four-year bachelor's degree programs run by Ministry of Education, and part-time diploma programs (Diploma in English and Post graduate Diploma in English Program run by Centre of Human Resource) in the study of several Asian and European languages.

The university is located on the 62nd Street, between 22nd and 23rd Streets, Aungmyethazan Township, Mandalay. Totally over 1600 students from Upper Myanmar and foreign countries are studied various languages in this university.

Languages that are currently studied at this university are:
English,
Chinese,
Japanese,
French,
Korean,
German,
Russian,
Thai, and
Myanmar for international students.

See also
 Yangon University of Foreign Languages

Educational institutions established in 1997
Universities and colleges in Mandalay
Arts and Science universities in Myanmar
Universities and colleges in Myanmar
1997 establishments in Myanmar